Sphinctrina is a genus of lichenicolous fungi, usually not lichenized, in the family Sphinctrinaceae. Its species are most commonly parasitic on lichens of the genus Pertusaria.

Species
Sphinctrina anglica 
Sphinctrina benmargana 
Sphinctrina intermedia 
Sphinctrina leucopoda 
Sphinctrina ophioparmae 
Sphinctrina pallidella 
Sphinctrina paramerae 
Sphinctrina tubaeformis 
Sphinctrina turbinata

References

Eurotiomycetes
Eurotiomycetes genera
Taxa described in 1825
Taxa named by Elias Magnus Fries